Aleksandr Aleksandrovich Andrienko (born 8 May 1990 in Myski) is a Russian alpine ski racer.

Biography
Born on May 8, 1990 in Myski, Kemerovo Oblast. Since childhood, he has been engaged in skiing. His first coach was Ilya  Poluarshinov.

He graduated from the Chernomyrdin Moscow State Open University.

Andrienko was Champion of Russia 2017 in giant slalom. He was the winner of several international competitions. In January 2018, it was announced that Andrienko would perform at the Olympic Games in Pyeongchang. Later, the Russian national team coaching staff announced that Andrienko had to withdraw from the injury from the competition and would not perform in Korea.

He lives in Kaluga.

References

External links
 Браво, Александр Андриенко!

1990 births
Living people
Russian male alpine skiers
Universiade medalists in alpine skiing
Universiade bronze medalists for Russia
Competitors at the 2017 Winter Universiade
People from Myski
Alpine skiers at the 2022 Winter Olympics
Olympic alpine skiers of Russia
Sportspeople from Kemerovo Oblast